A list of films produced in France in 1983.

References

Footnotes

Sources

External links
 1983 in France
 1983 in French television
 French films of 1983 at the Internet Movie Database
French films of 1983 at Cinema-francais.fr

1983
Films
Lists of 1983 films by country or language